Sikkil R. Bhaskaran (4 May 1936 – 20 July 2021)  was a violinist in Carnatic music and Tamil Isai.

Early life
Bhaskaran was born to R. Rajagopalan and R. Vedavalli Ammal, a family that has traditionally had involvement in music. As a child, he was trained in music and Baratham under his maternal grandfather Sikkal Ramaswami Pillai, who was awarded the Kalaimamani title and Sangeetha Nataka Academy award by Tamil Nadu and Central Government, respectively. At the age of 11, Bhaskaran learnt violin from Thiruvarur Subba Iyer for two years, before he was trained in music for three years by music professor, Mayuram Govindaraja Pillai. Later, he studied violin in a regular Gurukula system for two years with music professor, Kumbakonam Rajamanickam Pillai.

Awards and recognition 
 1961 – the Youngest of Vidwan Award and Gold Medal was presented by the Chennai Music Academy. 
 1973 – the Innisai Kalamamani title was given by Kumbakonam Vani Vilasa Sabha.
 1980 – the Senior Vidwan Award was given by the Chennai Music Academy. 
 1983 – the Kalaimamani title was given by Tamil Nadu Iyal Isai Nataka Manram in recognition of his service to music.
 1983 – was named as "Asthana Vidwan" by Sri Kanchi Kamakotti Peetam
 1983 – the Gana Kala Bharatha title was given by Karur Narada Gana Sabha.
 1983 – the Suswara Sukalaya Sangeetha Award was given by the Tambaram Purandarai Mahotsava Committee.
 1987 – the "Nada Oli Ratnam" award was conferred by Dandayuthapani Bharathanatya Kalalayam.
 1988 – Thiruvaiyaru Tamil Isai Sangam honoured him with the title, "Villisai Vender".
 1990 – the "Vidya Sangeetha Bushanam" title was awarded by the Bhairavi Indian Fine Arts Society in Cleveland, USA.
 1991 – the "Sangeetha Kalamrutha" title was conferred by Sri Gnanda Seva Samaj.
 1994 – Sri Virupaksha Vidyaranyathe Maha Peetam appointed Sri Bhaskaran as "Asthana Vidwan" and awarded him the "Nadopasana" title, in Hampi, Karnataka.
 1998 – the Perumpana Nambi title was given by Lalgudi Pun Araichi Vithagar P. Sundaresanar Nedukan Committee.
 1999 – the "Violin Isai Chelvam" title was given by Chennai Muthamizh Peravai.
 1999 – the "Thirupugazh Mani" title was given by the Chennai Arunagirinathar Isai Sangam. 
 1999 – Mumbai Bhandup Fine Arts conferred the title of "Nada Kalanidhi"
 2 January 2000 – the "Kailaiko" title was given by the Chennai Tamilar Kalai Mandram.
 25 February 2001 – the "Isai Kaddal" title was given by the Karakudi Tamil Isai Sangam.
 9 February 2002 – he was awarded the title "Panpalar" by Thanthai Periyar Tamil Isai Mandram Chennai.
 21 April 2002 – the Sangeetha Seva Neeratha title was awarded by Chennai Sangeetha Vidwasamajam.
 12 December 2002 – the "Violin Nadhamani" title was awarded by Charubala Mohan Trust, Chennai.
 7 June 2003 – Mutthamizh Vizha Tamil Brahmin's Association Sunada Suda Karaga.
 18 March 2005 – Nada Gana Suga Laya Sri Kaka pujandar arul Vzha, Selaiyur.
 1 January 2006 – he won the senior/instrumental first prize and the "Sangitha Kalanith Pappa Venkataramiah" award at the 79th Music Madras Academy Annual Conference.
 26 December 2006 – he was presented with the Thamizh Isai Vizha Sirgali Govindarajan Memorial Award by Karthik Fine Arts at Anna Nagar, Chennai.
 14 December 2008 – Isai Natya Natakavizha, Naradagana Sabhia, Chennai – Senior Musician Award.
 2010 – he was awarded the Maharajapuram Vishwanathan Iyer Memorial Award and gold medal.
 31 December 2010 – he was given the Nadha Kala Vipanchee award.
 28 December 2012 – Mayavaram Govindaraja Pillai Centenary Memorial Award to Sri Bhaskaran, from Chennai Fine Arts

References

Sources
 Bhaskar, Radha. "A Versatile Violinist... Sikkil R. Bhaskaran." Samudhra. December 2009: 3–11. Print.
 "Bout of swaras." The Hindu. [Chennai] 2 January 2004: FR-8. Print.
 Giridhar, S.R. "Elaborate, attractive alapana." The Hindu. [Chennai] 25 December 1998: 35. Print.
 "Maharajapuram Viswanatha Iyer Memorial Award presented." The Hindu. [Chennai] 29 November 2010. Print. 
 S.K. "Vintage stuff." The Hindu. [Chennai] 28 December 2001: FR-14. Print.
 Vishwanath, Narayana. "Debate on city's cultural events." City Express. [Chennai] 16 April 2012. Print. 
 V, Sarada. "Thyagaraja comes alive via Trichur's tribute." The Hitavada. [Chennai] 31 August 1995: 14. Print.

Carnatic violinists
Tamil musicians
People from Thanjavur district
1936 births
2021 deaths
21st-century violinists